St. John's Church is a historic church at 101 Chapel Street in Portsmouth, New Hampshire, United States. The brick building was designed by Alexander Parris and built in 1807; it was the first brick church in the state of New Hampshire, and is a rare surviving early design by Parris. The building was listed on the National Register of Historic Places in 1978. The church is home to an Episcopal congregation organized in 1732, with roots in the city's 17th-century founding.

Description and history
St. John's Church is located on the east side of downtown Portsmouth, between Church and Bow streets near the city's eastern waterfront. It is a two-story brick building, facing west toward Church Street. Its main facade has a slightly projecting center section, which has a recessed entry, as do the two flanking bays. Above each of these entries are Palladian windows. The triangular gable pediment has a lunette window in its tympanum. The interior space is predominantly filled with slip pews, although some original box pews survive in the galleries. The interior ceiling was painted with a trompe-l'œil coffered ceiling in 1848.

Portsmouth's Episcopalian congregational history dates to 1638, when a church was established in the Strawbery Banke area.  This congregation's minister was forced out by Massachusetts Bay Colony authorities. (Portsmouth was at the time subject to oversight by that colony's Puritan leaders.) In 1732 a new congregation was organized, and established in a wooden church on the site of the present St. John's. That church burned in a major fire in 1806 that destroyed more than 300 buildings in the city. The present edifice was erected in 1807, and was the first brick church building in the state. It is also one of the first works of architect Alexander Parris, before he became well known for his work in Boston and elsewhere.

See also
National Register of Historic Places listings in Rockingham County, New Hampshire

References

External links

Official church website

Episcopal church buildings in New Hampshire
Churches on the National Register of Historic Places in New Hampshire
Churches completed in 1807
19th-century Episcopal church buildings
Churches in Rockingham County, New Hampshire
Buildings and structures in Portsmouth, New Hampshire
Tourist attractions in Portsmouth, New Hampshire
National Register of Historic Places in Portsmouth, New Hampshire